John MacDonald was an American football coach.  He served as the head football coach at Boston University from 1918 to 1919, compiling a record of 3–6–1.

Head coaching record

References

Year of birth missing
Year of death missing
Boston University Terriers football coaches